Amphisbaena bolivica is a species of worm lizards found in Argentina, Bolivia, and Paraguay.

References

bolivica
Reptiles described in 1929
Taxa named by Robert Mertens